Gopi is a word of Sanskrit origin meaning "cow-herd girl'".

Gopi may also refer to:

Bharath Gopi, Malayali Indian actor, director, and producer
Gopichand Lagadapati (born 1981), Indian actor, writer and director
Gopi (1970 film), a Hindi film
Gopi (2019 film), a drama film